Katherine Crawford may refer to:
 Katherine B. Crawford (born 1966), an American historian
 Katherine Crawford (1970s actress)
 Kathryn Crawford (1908–1980), or Katherine Crawford, or Kitty Moran, an American actress of the 1920s and 1930s
 Katherine, a child victim of the Crawford family murder

See also
 Kate Crawford, an Australian writer, composer, producer and academic
 Kathy Crawford (born 1942), an American author, business owner, and politician 
 Katy Crawford (born 1987), an American Christian musician